The School of Visual Arts New York City (SVA NYC) is a private for-profit art school in New York City. It was founded in 1947 and is a member of the Association of Independent Colleges of Art and Design.

History
This school was started by Silas H. Rhodes and Burne Hogarth in 1947 as the Cartoonists and Illustrators School; it had three teachers and 35 students, most of whom were World War II veterans who had a large part of their tuition underwritten by the U.S. government's G.I. Bill. It was renamed the School of Visual Arts in 1956 and offered its first degrees in 1972. In 1983, it introduced a Master of Fine Arts in painting, drawing and sculpture.

The school has a faculty of more than 1,100 and a student body of over 3,000. It offers 11 undergraduate and 22 graduate degree programs, and is accredited by the Commission on Higher Education of the Middle States Association of Colleges and Schools and the National Association of Schools of Art and Design.

The interior design BFA is accredited by the Council for Interior Design Accreditation, the art therapy MPS is approved by the American Art Therapy Association, and the art education MA is accredited by the Council for the Accreditation of Educator Preparation.

The current school logo was created in 1997 by George Tscherny for its 50th anniversary, and redesigned in 2013.

In 2019 the school began the process of converting to nonprofit, with the SVA alumni organization (which is already an IRS tax-exempt entity) planning to purchase the school from its owners, who are retiring.

Commencement speakers have included Susan Sontag, Carrie Mae Weems, Gloria Steinem, Roxane Gay, and John Waters.

Continuing education
The continuing education division offers noncredit courses from most departments; a selection of advertising, branding, cartooning, copywriting, illustration and marketing courses taught in Spanish; professional development and corporate training courses; and summer residency programs.

The school offers short-term study abroad programs in various creative fields.

Location and campus
The school has several buildings in the Gramercy Park neighborhood, on Manhattan's east side, and in the Chelsea neighborhood, on the west side. There is a residence hall on Ludlow Street, in the Lower East Side. From 1994 to 1997, it had a branch campus in Savannah, Georgia; this was closed following a lawsuit from the Savannah College of Art and Design.

Library 
The library holds books, periodicals, audio recordings, films and other media; the Milton Glaser Design Study Center and Archives, which comprises the collections of Chermayeff & Geismar, Seymour Chwast, Heinz Edelmann, Milton Glaser, Steven Heller, Ed McCabe, James McMullan, Tony Palladino, George Tscherny and Henry Wolf; and the SVA Archives, a repository for materials pertaining to the college's history.

West 21st Street buildings
The building at 133 to 141 West 21st Street, between Sixth Avenue and Seventh Avenue in Chelsea, has studios for drawing and painting classes.

The buildings at 132 and 136 West 21st Street have offices, classrooms and studios for art criticism, art education, art therapy, cartooning, computer art, design, illustration and writing. The building at 132 West 21st Street houses the Visible Futures Lab, a workshop featuring traditional and emerging fabrication technology, which regularly hosts artists in residence.

Theatre

The Theatre, also known as the SVA Theatre, is at 333 West 23rd Street, between Eighth Avenue and Ninth Avenue, in Chelsea.

The site was formerly called the 23rd Street Theatre, and served as the home of the Roundabout Theatre Company, from 1972 until 1984; when their lease expired, the venue was converted into a movie theatre, the Clearview Chelsea West Cinema.

It was purchased in 2008, renovated, and reopened in January 2009. Milton Glaser designed the theatre's renovated interior and exterior, including the sculpture situated atop its marquee. The  facility houses two separate auditoriums, one with 265 seats and one with 480, and hosts class meetings, lectures, screenings and other public events. It has also hosted the red-carpet New York première of Ethan Hawke's The Daybreakers and a diverse list of world premières, ranging from Lucy Liu's 2010 feature documentary Redlight, to the 2011 Fox animated comedy Allen Gregory; and the 2012 film The Hunger Games. In 2013, Beyoncé held a release party and screening for her record-setting, self-titled visual album at the theatre. Community partners that have used the theatre include the Tribeca and GenArt film festivals, Mayor Michael Bloomberg's PlaNYC environmental initiative, and the Mayor's Office of Film, Theatre & Broadcasting. The theater is also home to the Dusty Film & Animation Festival, held annually since 1990, which showcases the work of emerging filmmakers and animators from the college's BFA Film and Video and BFA Animation programs.

Residence halls

There are several residence halls available for students at SVA, including:

23rd Street Residence (formerly New Residence), at 215 East 23rd Street, is an apartment-style dormitory reserved for new students.
24th Street Residence, is a 146,000-square-foot, 14-story residence hall that opened in August 2016. The site was purchased by Magnum Real Estate Group and 40 North in April 2015 for $32.25 million from the nonprofit International Center for the Disabled. It houses 505 residents in 242 suites, including office space, and serves as the flagship residence hall for the school.
Ludlow Residence, at 101 Ludlow Street (abutting Delancey Street), on the Lower East Side, opened in 2009. This tower has 259 single and 47 double rooms.

Former residence halls
George Washington Residence, at 23 Lexington Avenue (between 23rd Street and 24th Street).

SVA Galleries 
SVA maintains three permanent gallery locations across its campus—SVA Gramercy Gallery, SVA Flatiron Gallery, and SVA Chelsea Gallery—which exhibit work from both students and established creative professionals. Every year, the SVA Chelsea Gallery stages an exhibition for its Masters Series recipient, who are honored with both an award and retrospective exhibition. The 2022 Masters Series Recipient was photographer, MacArthur Genius Grant-, and Pulitzer Prize-winner Lynsey Addario for her documentation of civilian life in conflict zones; the retrospective was covered by publications such as the New York Times, The Guardian, and Vanity Fair.

Notable alumni and instructors

References

External links

 
Art schools in New York City
Culture of New York City
Animation schools in the United States
Design schools in the United States
Educational institutions established in 1947
For-profit universities and colleges in the United States
Graphic design schools in the United States
Universities and colleges in New York City
Universities and colleges in Manhattan
1947 establishments in New York City
Gramercy Park
Chelsea, Manhattan
For profit schools in Manhattan